The Quinchía mine is a gold mine in Colombia. The mine is located in Quinchía, Risaralda.

Description 
These intrusive centers are composed of dykes and stocks emplaced in intermediate to felsic volcanic rocks of the Miocene Combia Formation and in Cretaceous basalts. All target centers host gold and copper mineralization.

The volcanic member of the Combia Formation is predominantly composed of basaltic and andesitic leaks, volcanic breccias and porphyry deposits of andesitic to dacitic composition. The mineralizations occur in porphyry veins in the andesitic sections without visible hydrothermal alterations.

These veins are mainly composed of quartz, chalcopyrite, pyrite and sphalerite.

Additionally, a 1997 study performed by the ICP, revealed concentrations of more than 1000 ppm of copper, lead and zinc. The observed mineralizations suggest that they are related with a contact zone of porphyric intrusions into the Combia Formation and constitute fractures filled by fluids at a later stage.

See also 

 List of mining areas in Colombia
 La Colosa mine
 Cerro Matoso mine

References

Bibliography 
 

Gold mines in Colombia
Buildings and structures in Risaralda Department
2006 establishments in Colombia